The Trollhättan Mosque, is a large Shia Muslim mosque in the country located in Trollhättan, Västra Götaland County, Sweden.

After Idi Amin ordered in 1972 the expulsion of all Asians from Uganda, many of them were Shia Muslims who settled in Sweden. In 1976 they've established local Islamic centre, and in 1985 the mosque was built. On 14 August, 1993 neo-nazis attacked the (original) mosque with molotov cocktails causing extensive damage to the building and its destruction. The present mosque is larger and built in the same place where the original mosque was located.

References

1985 establishments in Sweden
Mosques completed in 1985
Shia mosques in Sweden
Attacks on Shiite mosques
Anti-Muslim violence in Europe
Arson in Sweden
Religious buildings and structures destroyed by arson